"I Found Heaven" is a song by English boy band Take That from their debut studio album, Take That & Party. It was released as the album's fifth single on 3 August 1992.

Background
Written and produced by American singer Billy Griffin and English producer Ian Levine, it was released on 3 August 1992 as the fifth single from the band's debut album, Take That & Party (1992). It became the group's second top-20 single, charting at number fifteen on the UK Singles Chart. "I Found Heaven" is the first song by Take That to feature both Gary Barlow and Robbie Williams on lead vocals, and also the only non-cover written by someone else than the band.

In Gary Barlow's autobiography My Take, he states that the band hates the song: "The song Ian made us sing was truly fucking awful. I still hate it to this day. In fact, we all hate it and absolutely refuse to perform it on stage. It is, by a huge margin, the worst song of Take That's and my career. At the time I said nothing because I felt I didn't have a leg to stand on."

Although often regarded as Robbie Williams' first song on lead vocals, some parts of the song were mixed in with vocals by Billy Griffin because Williams could not reach the high notes. Williams reportedly walked out of the session after an argument with Ian Levine regarding the matter.
Also Ian Levine claimed that Jason Orange did not sing on the song because he felt that Orange did not have the needed vocal abilities at the time.

Critical reception
Music & Media commented, "These newcomers in the rich British tradition of teeny hoppers—from the Bay City Rollers to Wham! and Bros—try the now popular close harmony pop style. Judging by their current hit status, it is already widely recognized in the UK."

Music video
The music video for the single was filmed on Sandown Beach on the Isle of Wight, and the yellow car featured is owned by a local resident, and is fairly well known amongst the islanders. The band perform the song on the beach whilst clips of the band relaxing on the beach are intercut with the video. In Gary Barlow's autobiography: 'My Take', he expressed that the band were disappointed with the location on which the video was filmed. They apparently hoped for the video to be shot in an exotic continent.

Track listings

Personnel
 Gary Barlow – co-lead vocals, backing vocals
 Robbie Williams – co-lead vocals, backing vocals
 Howard Donald – backing vocals
 Jason Orange – backing vocals
 Mark Owen – backing vocals
 Billy Griffin – additional co-lead vocals, backing vocals

Charts

References

Take That songs
1992 singles
1992 songs
RCA Records singles
Song recordings produced by Ian Levine
Songs written by Billy Griffin
Songs written by Ian Levine